Antonio Gallardo Palacios (born 19 April 1989) is a Mexican former footballer who last played as a midfielder for Club Necaxa on loan from C.D. Guadalajara.

Club career
Gallardo made his debut with Club Deportivo Guadalajara against Pachuca on 19 February 2011.

References

External links

 at Guadalajara official website 

1989 births
Living people
Footballers from Guadalajara, Jalisco
Association football midfielders
Mexican footballers
2011 Copa América players
C.D. Guadalajara footballers
Querétaro F.C. footballers
Club Necaxa footballers
Liga MX players